Raul-Stig Rästa (born 24 February 1980) is an Estonian singer and songwriter who, along with singer Elina Born, represented Estonia in the Eurovision Song Contest 2015 with the song "Goodbye to Yesterday".

Career
Between 2002 and 2006 he formed a band Slobodan River with Ithaka Maria and Tomi Rahula. Since 2006 he has played in Traffic and also in Outloudz since 2010. In 2011 he was a contestant in the fifth season of Let's Dance. He was partnered with Karina Vesman and they finished in fourth place. In 2012, Stig played Moritz in the Estonian original production of the musical Spring Awakening.

Eurovision Song Contest 
Rästa tried several times to represent Estonia at the Eurovision Song Contest. He competed with Slobodan River in Eurolaul 2003 and 2004, then with Traffic in Eurolaul 2008 and Eesti Laul 2009, 2012, 2014, 2020, and he also finished runner up with Outloudz in Eesti Laul 2011.

Rästa entered Eesti Laul 2015 with the song "Goodbye to Yesterday", a duet with Elina Born. The song went on to win its semi final and top both the jury and the televote scores, before doing the same in the final and winning in a landslide in the superfinal, with 79% of the popular vote. In the contest itself, the entry qualified for the grand final, where it placed 7th with 106 points.

He co-wrote the song "Play" by Jüri Pootsmann, which represented Estonia at the Eurovision Song Contest 2016, coming last in its semi and failing to qualify. 

Rästa returned for the second time as a composer for Elina Born in Eesti Laul 2017, she finished 10th in the final with the song "In or Out". He already wrote her song for her first Eesti Laul in 2013, "Enough" came 8th in the final.

He competed by himself in Eesti Laul 2018 with the song "Home", which went on to place second in the contest.

He co-wrote the song "Storm" by Victor Crone, which represented Estonia at the Eurovision Song Contest 2019, placing 20th in the final with 76 points.

He participated in Eesti Laul 2022 with the song "Interstellar", placing 9th in the final.

Discography

Singles

References

Living people
1980 births
21st-century Estonian male singers
Estonian songwriters
English-language singers from Estonia
Eurovision Song Contest entrants for Estonia
Eurovision Song Contest entrants of 2015
Eesti Laul winners